Lieselot Decroix (born 12 May 1987 in Poperinge) is a Belgian retired professional road cyclist. She represented her nation Belgium at the 2008 Summer Olympics, and has currently competed under an annual contract for CyclelivePlus-Zannata Women's Team.

Decroix qualified for the Belgian squad, as a lone female cyclist, in the women's road race at the 2008 Summer Olympics in Beijing by finishing among the top 24 and receiving a berth from the UCI World Cup. She successfully completed a grueling race with a forty-fourth-place finish through a vast field of sixty-six cyclists in  3:36:35, surpassing Mexico's Alessandra Grassi by less than a second.

Major results

2007
 7th Overall Tour Cycliste Féminin International de l'Ardèche
1st Young rider classification
2008
 8th Road race, UEC European Under-23 Road Championships
 10th La Flèche Wallonne Féminine
2009
 National Road Championships
3rd Time trial
4th Road race
2011
 8th Overall Gracia–Orlová
1st Stage 4
2015
 9th Overall Belgium Tour
 10th Cholet Pays de Loire Dames
2016
 3rd Ronde van Gelderland

References

External links
Profile – CyclelivePlus-Zannata 
NBC 2008 Olympics profile

1987 births
Living people
Belgian female cyclists
Cyclists at the 2008 Summer Olympics
Olympic cyclists of Belgium
People from Poperinge
Cyclists from West Flanders
21st-century Belgian women